E. M. Natarajan (died 28 April 2001) was an Indian politician and former Member of the Legislative Assembly of Tamil Nadu. He was elected to the Tamil Nadu legislative assembly as a Dravida Munnetra Kazhagam candidate from Anthiyur constituency in 1967 and 1971 elections.

References 

Dravida Munnetra Kazhagam politicians
Year of birth missing
2001 deaths
Tamil Nadu MLAs 1971–1976